This is a list of episodes from the fifth season of Shark Tank.

Episodes

Before the start of this season, Mark Cuban insisted that the production company relinquish its equity clause (two percent of their profits or five percent equity in their company) with respect to featured businesses who choose to do a deal with the sharks. The change applied to all businesses, both from that point on and retroactively.John Paul Mitchell Systems co-founder John Paul DeJoria and New York Giants owner Steve Tisch appeared as guest sharks this season.

References

External links 
 Official website
 

5
2013 American television seasons
2014 American television seasons